Stade de Korhogo is a planned football stadium to be constructed in Korhogo, Ivory Coast. The stadium will have a capacity of 20,000 seats.

The construction will begin in September 2018. The stadium is expected to host many matches of the 2023 Africa Cup of Nations.

References

Football venues in Ivory Coast
Sport in Savanes District

Buildings and structures in Savanes District
2023 Africa Cup of Nations stadiums